The Göksu (Turkish for "sky water", also called Geuk Su, Goksu Nehri;) is a river on the Taşeli plateau (Turkey). Both its sources arise in the Taurus Mountains—the northern in the Geyik Mountains and the southern in the Haydar Mountains. Their confluence is south of Mut.

Course
The river is 260 km long and empties into the Mediterranean Sea 16 km southeast of Silifke (in Mersin province). The delta of the Göksu, including Akgöl Lake and Paradeniz Lagoon, is one of the most important breeding areas in the Near East; over 300 bird species have been observed. Among others, flamingos, herons, bee-eaters, kingfishers, gulls, nightingales and warblers breed here. The endangered loggerhead sea turtle (Caretta caretta) lays eggs here.

Due to demand for summer vacation apartments by the locals, and since necessary precautions are not taken and public attention is minimal in this part of Turkey, the ecosystem around Akgöl Lake and Paradeniz Lagoon is in heavy danger.

History

In 1190, while on the Third Crusade, Emperor Frederick Barbarossa drowned in the river, then known by its Latin name Saleph and located within the Armenian Kingdom of Cilicia. The crusaders had reached Asia Minor in March, where the emperor continued his campaign to the Holy Land. Having plundered the city of Konya and defeated the forces of the Sultanate of Rum at the Battle of Iconium, his forces arrived on the banks of the river on June 10.

Several contradictory statements reflect the circumstances of his sudden death, which have not been conclusively established. According to some sources, the emperor was lost in the current when he tried to cross the water near Silifke; other chronicles report he wished to cool down from the heat of the day and suffered a heart attack while taking a bath. The mortal remains were preserved according to the Mos Teutonicus process and transferred to Tarsus, Antioch and Tyre by his followers.

Once without a leader, his crusader army dispersed; the remnants later joined the Siege of Acre. A monument in Barbarossa's honor was erected on the road from Silifke to Mut.

See also
Ermenek Dam
Blue Tunnel Project
Frederick Barbarossa Memorial

References

Rivers of Turkey
Ramsar sites in Turkey
Rivers of Mersin Province